Wilbert Colin Thatcher (born August 25, 1938) is a Canadian politician who was convicted for the murder of his ex-wife, JoAnn Wilson.

Early life
Colin Thatcher was born in Toronto, Ontario, on August 25, 1938. His father, Saskatchewan-born Ross Thatcher, was working for Canada Packers, a predecessor of Maple Leaf Foods, at the time of his birth. He moved to Saskatchewan when his father returned home to run the family business. His father subsequently entered politics and became Premier of Saskatchewan from 1964 to 1971.

Thatcher began studying agriculture at the University of Saskatchewan. After one year, he transferred to Iowa State University. He graduated from Iowa State with B.S. and M.S. degrees in agriculture, and returned to Saskatchewan to work on his father's ranch in Moose Jaw.

Political career
After his father's death in 1971, Thatcher cultivated his own interest in politics. In 1975, he won the provincial riding of Thunder Creek as a Liberal, but he defected to the Progressive Conservatives two years later. Thatcher served from 1982 to 1983 as the Minister of Energy. On January 17, 1983, Thatcher resigned his portfolio, citing family and financial reasons.

Personal life

Marriage and separation
He met his future wife JoAnn Geiger at the University of Iowa. They married on August 12, 1962 and had three children, Greg, Regan and Stephanie. Thatcher admitted to infidelity during the course of the marriage and the couple separated in August 1979. They ended up fighting a long, hotly contested series of custody, access and matrimonial property battles. In 1980, they were divorced and Geiger was awarded custody of two of their three children, as well as $820,000 for her share of the marital property.

On May 17, 1981, Geiger was shot and wounded while in the kitchen of her home. A bullet fired from a high‑powered rifle passed through a triple glaze glass window and struck her in the shoulder. As a result of the shooting, Geiger was hospitalized for about three weeks. No one was ever charged with the 1981 shooting.

Murder of ex-wife
On January 21, 1983, four days after Thatcher's resignation as Minister of Energy in Premier Grant Devine's government, Geiger was found bludgeoned and shot to death in the garage of her Regina home. Thatcher was formally charged on May 7, 1984, after a lengthy police investigation.

Thatcher was tried in Saskatoon for the murder of his ex-wife in the autumn of 1984. In addition to the evidence presented, he insisted on testifying so that he could try and explain the recorded conversation between Gary Anderson and him. He was found guilty under the prosecution of Serge Kujawa and was given a sentence of life imprisonment with no eligibility for parole for 25 years.

In late April 1985, two weeks before his appeal, a package postmarked Winnipeg arrived at the Regina Leader-Post. The package contained an anonymous confession to the murder of Geiger, a homemade hatchet the writer claimed was the murder weapon, and two photographs of a nude woman whom the letter claimed was Geiger. The newspaper turned the package over to the Regina Police. After numerous requests for disclosure of the photos and hatchet, the crown eventually admitted to Thatcher's attorney that they had been lost.

On November 30, 2006 Thatcher was granted full parole.

Thatcher has written a 440-page book about his case, Final Appeal: Anatomy of a Frame. It was released by ECW Press on September 1, 2009. On April 21, 2010, Thatcher agreed to relinquish any profits related to the sale of his book, such as his $5,000 advance from his publisher. Thatcher has also instructed the publisher of his book to forward any further royalties from its sale to the Saskatchewan Minister of Finance. In 2011, funds from the sale of the book in the amount of $13,866.44 were turned over to the Ministry of Justice. The province subsequently donated the funds to two groups assisting victims of domestic violence and survivors of homicide.

In popular culture
In 1985, author Maggie Siggins wrote the book A Canadian Tragedy: JoAnn and Colin Thatcher: A Story of Love and Hate. A two-part television mini-series based on the book called Love and Hate: The Story of Colin and JoAnn Thatcher was produced by CBC Television in 1989, starring Kenneth Welsh as Colin Thatcher and Kate Nelligan as JoAnn Thatcher Wilson.

Biographies
Bird, Heather. Not Above The Law: The Tragic Story of JoAnn Wilson and Colin Thatcher. Toronto: Key Porter Books Limited, 1985.
Mankiewicz, Francis, director. Love and Hate: The Story of Colin and JoAnn Thatcher. (Television movie.) Canadian Broadcasting Corporation, 1989. This film starred Kenneth Welsh and Kate Nelligan as Colin and JoAnn Thatcher.
Siggins, Maggie. A Canadian Tragedy, JoAnn & Colin Thatcher: A Story of Love and Hate. Toronto: McClelland & Stewart, 1985.
Thatcher, Colin. Backrooms: A Story of Politics. Douglas & McIntyre, 1985.
Wilson, Garrett & Lesley Wilson. Deny, Deny, Deny: The Rise and Fall of Colin Thatcher. Toronto: James Lorimer & Company, 1986.

References

External links
Crime Library article on Colin Thatcher
CBC's Colin Thatcher Timeline

Colin Thatcher returns to Sask. legislative building
CBC News: Colin Thatcher writing book about his case

Living people
Members of the Executive Council of Saskatchewan
Saskatchewan Liberal Party MLAs
Progressive Conservative Party of Saskatchewan MLAs
Politicians from Toronto
Canadian people convicted of murder
People convicted of murder by Canada
Canadian prisoners sentenced to life imprisonment
Prisoners sentenced to life imprisonment by Canada
People paroled from life sentence
Canadian politicians convicted of crimes
Politicians convicted of murder
1938 births